
Skarżysko County is a unit of territorial administration and local government (powiat) in Świętokrzyskie Voivodeship, south-central Poland. It came into being on January 1, 1999, as a result of the Polish local government reforms passed in 1998.

As of 2019 its total population is 74,343, out of which the population of Skarżysko-Kamienna is 45,068, that of Suchedniów is 8,347, and the rural population is 20,928.

Neighbouring counties
Skarżysko County is bordered by Szydłowiec County to the north, Starachowice County to the east, Kielce County to the south and Końskie County to the west.

Administrative division
The county is subdivided into five gminas (one urban, one urban-rural and three rural). These are listed in the following table, in descending order of population.

Territorial changes
As of 2006, Skarżysko County has undergone three territorial changes since its creation in 1999 – several villages from neighbouring counties have been incorporated:
 2000: Pogorzałe and Książece from Szydłowiec County, until then separate villages, became districts of Skarżysko-Kamienna.
 2001: Majków and Michałów from Starachowice County became part of Gmina Skarżysko Kościelne.
 2004: Kierz Niedźwiedzi from Szydłowiec County became part of Gmina Skarżysko Kościelne.

References

 
Land counties of Świętokrzyskie Voivodeship